Events from the year 1918 in Taiwan, Empire of Japan.

Incumbents

Central government of Japan
 Prime Minister: Terauchi Masatake, Hara Takashi

Taiwan
 Governor-General – Andō Teibi, Akashi Motojiro

Events
 6 June: Akashi Motojiro was promoted to general and appointed by Prime Minister Terauchi as the Governor-General of Taiwan.

Births
Su Beng, historian

References

 
Years of the 20th century in Taiwan